Maria Enzersdorf (Central Bavarian: Maria Enzasduaf) is a small city in the district of Mödling in the Austrian state of Lower Austria. 

There are several castles and ruins in the forests surrounding Maria Enzersdorf, including Liechtenstein Castle and the Schwarzer Turm (Black Tower) in the surrounding forest and Schloss Hunyadi in the town itself.

History 

Maria Enzersdorf was most likely settled by the Romans and the Celts.  It is mentioned for the first time in the 12th century.  During this time period was also when Liechtenstein Castle was constructed as a fortress against the Magyars.  

The town was destroyed in 1529 and 1683 by the first and second Ottoman sieges.

From 1938 to 1954, the town was part of Vienna's 24th district.

Population

Economy

The town is the location of the headquarters of the energy company EVN Group.

References

External links

In German - Maria Enzersdorf Attractions

Cities and towns in Mödling District